The 2018 Firestone Grand Prix of St. Petersburg was the first round of the 2018 IndyCar Series. The race was held on March 11, 2018, in St. Petersburg, Florida, on the city's temporary street circuit.

Background 
The race was the debut of the new standard aero kits.

Report

Qualifying 
Rookie Robert Wickens took the pole in his first ever IndyCar Series start, while newcomers Matheus Leist and Jordan King also made the Firestone Fast Six, qualifying third and fourth, respectively.

Race 

The race featured a record number of cautions (8), on-track passes (366) and lead changes (11).

Robert Wickens lead most of the race, until the last restart, when the 2nd place car of Alexander Rossi attempted a pass down the inside of turn 1. It seemed as though Rossi had completed the move, until he slid up the track, taking Wickens out, and leaving himself to limp home to 3rd in a damaged car.

Results

Qualifying 

Source for individual rounds:

Race 

Notes:
 Points include 1 point for leading at least 1 lap during a race, an additional 2 points for leading the most race laps, and 1 point for Pole Position.

Championship standings after the race 

Drivers' Championship standings

Manufacturer standings

 Note: Only the top five positions are included.

References

External links 
 Official Pit Stop Data 

Grand Prix of St. Petersburg
21st century in St. Petersburg, Florida
Firestone Grand Prix of St. Petersburg
Firestone Grand Prix of St. Petersburg
Firestone Grand Prix of St. Petersburg